The 2022–23 San Francisco Dons men's basketball team represents the University of San Francisco during the 2022–23 NCAA Division I men's basketball season. The Dons are led by first-year head coach Chris Gerlufsen, and play their home games at the War Memorial Gymnasium at the Sobrato Center as members of the West Coast Conference.

Previous season
The Dons finished the season the 2021–22 season 24–10, 10–6 in WCC play to finish in fourth place. In the WCC tournament, they defeated BYU in the third round before losing to Gonzaga in the semifinals. The Dons received an at-large bid to the NCAA tournament as the No. 10 seed in the East region, their first appearance since 1998. They lost in the first round to Murray State. 

The day after the tournament loss, head coach Todd Golden left the team after accepting the head coach position at Florida. Golden assistant Chris Gerlufsen was subsequently named the next head coach.

Offseason

Departures

Incoming transfers

2022 recruiting class
There were no incoming recruiting class of 2022.

Roster

Schedule and results

|-
!colspan=9 style=| Non-conference regular season

|-
!colspan=9 style=| WCC regular season

|-
!colspan=9 style=| WCC tournament

Source:

References

San Francisco Dons men's basketball seasons
San Francisco
San Francisco Dons
San Francisco Dons
2022 in San Francisco
2023 in San Francisco